Vivian Claude Kavanagh (2 June 1882 – 9 August 1917) was a New Zealand cricketer. He played one first-class match for Auckland in 1912/13. He was also a leading hockey player, who represented Auckland over many years as a half-back.

He fought in the Second Boer War, and enlisted to fight in World War I. He was killed in action on the Ypres Salient, and is buried at the Prowse Point War Cemetery.

See also
 List of Auckland representative cricketers
 List of cricketers who were killed during military service

References

External links
 

1882 births
1917 deaths
New Zealand cricketers
Auckland cricketers
Cricketers from Auckland
New Zealand male field hockey players
New Zealand military personnel killed in World War I
New Zealand military personnel of the Second Boer War
Burials at Prowse Point Commonwealth War Graves Commission Cemetery
New Zealand Military Forces personnel of World War I
New Zealand Army soldiers